Emergence is an outdoor 1981 bronze sculpture by Don Eckland, installed in the Education Courtyard, on the University of Oregon campus in Eugene, Oregon, in the United States. The work is one of two by Eckland on the campus; New Horizons (1981) is also installed in the Education Courtyard.

Description
Emergence is a cast bronze sculpture depicting a woman with long hair flowing down to her right upper thigh. Her hair is parted and covers both of her eyes. Eckland has described the work as a "young woman... poised at rest just prior to departing... [S]he is indeed ready to emerge."

See also
 1981 in art

References

External links
 Emergence at the Public Art Archive

1981 establishments in Oregon
1981 sculptures
Bronze sculptures in Oregon
Outdoor sculptures in Eugene, Oregon
Sculptures of women in Oregon
Statues in Eugene, Oregon
University of Oregon campus